The Third Bouffier cabinet was the state government of Hesse between 2019 and 2022, sworn in on 18 January 2019 after Volker Bouffier was elected as Minister-President of Hesse by the members of the Landtag of Hesse. It was the 22nd Cabinet of Hesse.

It was formed after the 2018 Hessian state election by the Christian Democratic Union (CDU) and Alliance 90/The Greens (GRÜNE). Excluding the Minister-President, the cabinet comprised eleven ministers. Seven were members of the CDU and four were members of the Greens.

After Bouffier's resignation as Minister-President, the third Bouffier cabinet was succeeded by the Rhein cabinet on 31 May 2022.

Formation 

The previous cabinet was a coalition government of the CDU and the Greens led by Minister-President Volker Bouffier of the CDU.

The election took place on 28 October 2018, and resulted in significant losses for the CDU, while the Greens became the second-largest party for the first time by a margin of less than 100 votes. The opposition SPD also suffered major losses, while the AfD entered the Landtag with 13%, the FDP and The Left recorded modest gains.

Though preliminary results indicated that the incumbent government would retain its majority, it was not certain due to the narrow margins and issues with the vote count. Whether the Greens or SPD would claim second place was also unclear. Final results were determined weeks later after recounts. Nonetheless, the CDU quickly stated that they would seek to lead a two-party government with either the Greens or SPD, and held exploratory talks with both. The FDP were also invited to talks, but lead candidate René Rock ruled out joining a coalition with the CDU and Greens since his party would not be mathematically necessary for a majority.

Also discussed was the possibility of a traffic light coalition between the Greens, SPD, and FDP, which would also hold a one-seat majority. Initially, the FDP rejected this on the basis that Tarek Al-Wazir had expressed a lack of interest in becoming Minister-President. However, as reviews of the vote count indicated that the SPD may have won more votes than the Greens and would be able to lay claim to the Minister-Presidency, the FDP agreed to meet with them on 9 November. The day before final results were released on 16 November, the three parties held joint discussions, after which SPD lead candidate Thorsten Schäfer-Gümbel voiced his confidence in their ability to come at an agreement. However, after final results showed that the Greens had indeed moved ahead of the SPD, a traffic light coalition was no longer considered possible as the FDP would not support a Green Minister-President. Schäfer-Gümbel subsequently declared the SPD would remain in opposition, leaving a renewed government between the CDU and Greens as the only practical option.

The same day, the CDU voted to extend an offer for coalition negotiations to the Greens, which they accepted. Discussions began on 19 November with the goal of finalising an agreement before Christmas. Negotiations were finalised on the morning of 19 December. The coalition contract, titled New Start in Change through Attitude, Orientation and Cohesion, was approved by 91% of Greens delegates and unanimously by the CDU committee, and was signed on 23 December.

Bouffier was elected as Minister-President by the Landtag on 18 January 2019, winning 69 votes out of 137 cast.

Composition

External links

References 

Government of Hesse
State governments of Germany
Cabinets established in 2019
2019 establishments in Germany
Cabinets disestablished in 2022
2022 disestablishments in Germany